Achyuta Pisharodi  (c. 1550 at Thrikkandiyur (aka Kundapura), Tirur, Kerala, India – 7 July 1621 in Kerala) was a Sanskrit grammarian, astrologer, astronomer and mathematician who studied under Jyeṣṭhadeva and was a member of Madhava of Sangamagrama's Kerala school of astronomy and mathematics. He is remembered mainly for his part in the composition of his student Melpathur Narayana Bhattathiri's devotional poem, Narayaneeyam.

Works
He discovered the techniques of 'the reduction of the ecliptic'. He authored Sphuta-nirnaya, Raasi-gola-sphuta-neeti (raasi meaning zodiac, gola meaning sphere and neeti roughly meaning rule), Karanottama (1593) and a four- chapter treatise Uparagakriyakrama on lunar and solar eclipses.

 Praveśaka
 An introduction to Sanskrit grammar.
 Karaṇottama
 Astronomical work dealing with the computation of the mean and true longitudes of the planets, with eclipses, and with the vyatūpātas of the sun and moon.
 Uparāgakriyākrama (1593)
 Treatise on lunar and solar eclipses.
 Sphuṭanirṇaya
 Astronomical text.
 Chāyāṣṭaka
 Astronomical text.
 Uparāgaviṃśati
 Manual on the computation of eclipses.
 Rāśigolasphuṭānīti
 Work concerned with the reduction of the moon’s true longitude in its own orbit to the ecliptic.
 Veṇvārohavyākhyā
 Malayalam commentary on the Veṇvāroha of Mādhava of Saṅgamagrāma (ca. 1340–1425) written at the request of the Azhvanchery Thambrakkal.
 Horāsāroccaya
 An adaptation of the Jātakapaddhati of Śrīpati.

Narayaneeyam
Pisharati is known to have scolded and provoked an errant Narayana to take up the Brahmin's duties of prayer and religious practices. He accepted Narayana as his student. Later when Pisharati was struck with paralysis (or rheumatism by another account), Narayana, unable to bear the pain of his dear guru, by way of Gurudakshina took the disease upon himself. As a result, Pisharati is said to have been cured, but no medicine could cure Narayana. As a last resort, Narayana went to Guruvayur and requested Thunchaththu Ramanujan Ezhuthachan, a great devotee of Guruvayoorappan, to suggest a remedy for his disease. Ramajunan Ezhuthachan advised him to compose a poetical work on the Avatars (incarnations) of Lord Vishnu beginning with that of Matsya (Fish). Narayana composed beautiful slokas in praise of Lord Guruvayurappan and recited them before the deity. He was soon cured of his disease.

The book of slokas written by Narayana were named Narayaneeyam. The day on which Narayana dedicated his Narayaneeyam to Sri Guruvayurappan is celebrated as "Narayaneeyam Dinam" every year at Guruvayur.

See also
Melpathur Narayana Bhattathiri
Narayaneeyam
Indian mathematics

References 

 David Pingree. "Acyuta Piṣāraṭi". Dictionary of Scientific Biography.
 S. Venkitasubramonia Iyer. "Acyuta Piṣāroṭi; His Date and Works" in JOR Madras''', 22 (1952–1953), 40–46.
 K. V. Sarma (2008), "Acyuta Pisarati", Encyclopaedia of the History of Science, Technology, and Medicine in Non-Western Cultures (2nd edition) edited by Helaine Selin, p. 19, Springer, .
 K. Kunjunni Raja. The Contribution of Kerala to  Sanskrit Literature (Madras, 1958), pp. 122–125.
  "Astronomy and Mathematics in Kerala" in Brahmavidyā'', 27 (1963), 158–162.

1550s births
1621 deaths
Scholars from Kerala
Kerala school of astronomy and mathematics
16th-century Indian astronomers
17th-century Indian astronomers
16th-century Indian mathematicians
17th-century Indian mathematicians
Scientists from Kerala
People from Malappuram district
16th-century Indian linguists
Writers from Kerala
Sanskrit writers
17th-century Indian linguists
People from Guruvayur